Punk Rock Guilt is the eighth solo album released from stoner rock musician Brant Bjork. The album was recorded and shelved in 2005, originally titled "The New Jersey Sessions."

Track listing

Credits
Produced by Dave Raphael
Recorded and mixed December 2005 by Dave Raphael at Glide On Fade Studios, New Jersey
Mastered by Dave Collins Los Angeles, California

Notes
The album was remastered and re-released in 2020 with new artwork on Bjork's current label, Heavy Psych Sounds.
The promotional release of this album had placed all of the songs in a  different order, and titled them all incorrectly save for the title track.
The promo release and 2LP feature a bonus track, which is "Chinarosa" from the previous two albums, done in the style to fit this album's sound.
One song cut from the album was released via the record label's website entitled "Jenny" - (3:12).

References 

2008 albums
Brant Bjork albums
Dine Alone Records albums